Ranae may refer to:
The Frogs (or Ranae in Latin), an ancient Greek comedy by Aristophanes
Besla ranae, a species of sea snail
Ophiotaenia ranae, a species of tapeworm
Hydrocharis morsus-ranae, a species of flowering plants